Ranch to Market Road 337 (RM 337) is a ranch-to-market road in the U.S. state of Texas that runs from Camp Wood east to Medina.  The route was designated in 1945 between Camp Wood and Leakey in Real County, but was gradually extended eastward over the years until in 1968 it stretched to RM 187 at Vanderpool in Bandera County.  In 1976, an additional  were added east from RM 187 to connect to SH 16 in Medina, bringing the road to its present form.

Passing through the canyonland of the Texas Hill Country northwest of San Antonio, RM 337 is known for its hairpin switchbacks and natural environment; it has been called one of the most scenic drives in Texas.  Texas Monthly magazine named the road no. 18 on its list of "75 Things We Love About Texas" in its April 2006 issue.

History
Ranch to Market Road 337 was first designated on June 11, 1945, as Farm to Market Road 337 (FM 337), traveling from Camp Wood to Leakey. On October 1, 1956, FM 337 was redesignated as RM 337. On October 31, 1957, it was extended  eastward, and on September 27, 1960, the route was extended another  eastward. On October 1, 1968, the highway was extended eastward 8 miles to an intersection with RM 187. On December 25, 1975, FM 1336 from SH 16 to RM 187 was added to the length of RM 337, adding  to the route.

Junction list

References

0337
Transportation in Real County, Texas